"Bitch" is a song recorded by the English rock band the Rolling Stones. Written by Mick Jagger and Keith Richards, "Bitch" is a "hard-bitten rocker" featuring Jagger on vocals and a powerful horn line. It was released as the B-side to the advance single, "Brown Sugar", from their ninth British and eleventh American studio album, Sticky Fingers. It was originally released one week before the album. Despite not being used as an official single by itself, the tune has garnered major airplay from AOR radio stations. The song was recorded in October 1970 at London's Olympic Studios, and at Stargroves using the Rolling Stones Mobile studio.

Music and lyrics 
"Bitch" was written by Jagger–Richards and recorded over many takes at London's Olympic Studios and at Stargroves using the Rolling Stones Mobile studio. Musically, "Bitch" is a hard rock song that incorporates a "pulse quickening" horn arrangement.

Composition 
"Bitch" was conceived during the Sticky Fingers sessions in October 1970. Richards was late that day, but when he arrived he transformed a loose jam into the trademark riff found on the released take. Andy Johns claimed: 

The song is also notable for its heavy brass section that punctuates the guitar riff after the choruses. Jagger said:

Critical reception 
"Bitch" was referred to as a "hard-bitten rocker" by the BBC in its 2007 retrospective review. Rolling Stone ranked the song as the seventy-sixth best song for the band. Comparing it to other seventies songs with similar titles, Rolling Stone stated that "none bitched harder or louder than this one".  Cash Box described it as "a classic rough and ready bash about."

Personnel
 Mick Jaggerlead vocals
 Keith Richardslead and rhythm guitar, backing vocals
 Mick Taylorrhythm guitar
 Bill Wymanbass guitar
 Charlie Wattsdrums
 Bobby Keyssaxophone
 Jim Pricetrumpet
 Jimmy Millerpercussion

Other releases
 Made in the Shade (1975)
 Time Waits for No One: Anthology 1971–1977 (1979)
 Jump Back: The Best of The Rolling Stones (1993)
 Singles 1971–2006 (2011)
 GRRR! (2012)
 Honk (2019)

References

External links
 Complete Official Lyrics (Archived by the Wayback Machine at the Internet Archive from www.rolling-stones-lyrics.com)

1971 songs
1971 singles
The Rolling Stones songs
Songs written by Jagger–Richards
Song recordings produced by Jimmy Miller
British hard rock songs